Cheung Po Tsai Cave is a natural cave where the famous Guangdong pirate Cheung Po Tsai, according to legend, kept his treasures. It is located on Hong Kong's outlying island of Cheung Chau and is a popular attraction of it. No treasures have been found in the cave.

Origin
Cheung Po Tsai was a famous pirate during the Jiaqing period of the Qing Dynasty and was active in the eastern part of the Guangdong Province. According to legend, the natural cave is the place Cheung hid in to avoid capture and one of the secret places he hid his treasures in. No traces of treasure have been found in the cave.

The cave is about 10 metres deep and 88 metres long from the entrance to the exit. The inside is dark and narrow, and the ground is slippery and uneven. In recent years, steel ladders have been added to facilitate visitors' access in and out of the cave. To enter, visitors must use the ladder and have to bring along a torch for illumination. The narrowness of the cave allows visitors to move only in a single file line, so they must enter from one side of the cave and leave on the other.  In 2012, the entrance of the cave was made even narrower after a large stone fell due to weathering.

In popular culture
The Amazing Race 17 visited this cave during the season's tenth episode.

Other Cheung Po Tsai Caves
Lamma Island Cheung Po Tsai Cave was located in Po Lo Tsui, Lamma Island. It was much darker and larger than Cheung Chau's cave, at 9 storeys deep. In 1979, the cave was presumed to be destroyed when the Lamma Island Power Station was built near the site. However, decades of rain and weathering has revealed an entrance to the cave, making it partly accessible again.

In addition, there are also Cheung Po Tsai Caves in Tap Mun, Sai Wan, Chung Hom Kok, Chek Chau, Siu Kau Yi Chau, and Longxue Island, Guangzhou.

See also
 List of tourist attractions in Hong Kong

References

External links
Cheung Po Tsai Cave at discoverhongkong.com
Pictures of the cave

Tourist attractions in Hong Kong
Caves of Hong Kong
Historic sites in Hong Kong